Eugene Lee may refer to:

 Eugene Gordon Lee (1933–2005), American child actor
 Eugene Lee (actor) (born 1953), African-American actor
 Eugene C. Lee, American radio deejay, actor, and cable television host
 Eugene Lee (designer) (1939–2023), American set designer
 Eugene Lee (entrepreneur), American businessman
 Eugene Lee (sports agent) (born 1973), sports agent and lawyer
 Lee Eugene (born 2004), South Korean actor

See also
Eugene Lee-Hamilton (1845–1907), English poet